The Intel P67 is a mainstream chipset created by Intel. It was launched to market in January 2011, the first edition of this chipset had a faulty SATA 3.0 controller and Intel had to issue a hardware fix to resolve this problem. This fix (Revision B3) was launched to market at the beginning of March 2011.

Features 

Standard features:
 Supports processor overclocking (Only available for unlocked processors: Core i5-2500K, Core i5-2550K, Core i7-2600K and 2700K)
 Supports memory overclocking
 1× PCI Express 2.0 x16 lanes at 16 GB/s bandwidth
 2× Serial ATA (SATA) 3.0 (6 Gbit/s) ports
 4× Serial ATA (SATA) 2.0(3 Gbit/s) ports
 14× Universal Serial Bus (USB) 2.0 ports
 Dual-channel DDR3 memory
 Integrated Gigabit Ethernet MAC

Optional features:
 SATA RAID support (0/1/10/5) through Intel Rapid Storage Technology
 2× PCI Express 2.0 x8 lanes at 8 GB/s bandwidth each

The P67 chipset is made to work in conjunction with Intel LGA 1155 CPUs. Note that the P67 chipset is not backward compatible with the LGA 1156 family of CPUs.

References

External links
Intel P67 Express Chipset Overview

P67